Penuballi is a village in the Khammam district of Telangana, India.  It is the headquarters of Penuballi Mandal.

Demographics
The population of Penuballi village was 8,915.

References

Villages in Khammam district